Raymond Tapiwa Mupandasekwa (born 28 April 1970) was installed as the Roman Catholic Bishop of Chinhoyi on 7 April 2018. He is the first black bishop of Chinhoyi Diocese. The first black African Redemptorist bishop in Zimbabwe, Africa and the whole Congregation of the Redemptorists.

Education 

 Chishawasha Seminary Harare-Diploma in Philosophy (1991-1993)
 Chishawasha Seminary Harare-Honours Degree in Religious Studies (1995-2000)
 St. Augustine College South Africa-Masters in Canon Law (2001-2003)
 Academia Alphosiana Rome-Masters in Moral Theology (2007-2010)
 Redemptorist finally professed:21 February 1998

Offices 

 Redemptorist Regional Superior (2015)
 Redemptorist Student formulator (2010-2015)
 Vice Rector of Holy Trinity College Harare (2014)
 Member of the board of Governors of Holy Trinity College
 Dean of Outer City Deanary (2013-2015)

Ministries 

 Curate of St. Fidelis Parish-Mabvuku, Harare (2001-2005)
 Parish Priest of St. Gerards Parish-Borrowdale, Harare (2005-2007)
 Parish Priest of St.Fidelis Parish-Mabvuku, Harare (2010-2015)
 Lecturer in Moral Theology-Chishawasha Seminary (2010-2014)
 Lecturer in Moral Theology-Holy Trinity College, Harare (2010-2015)
 Lecturer in Canon Law-Holy Trinity College, Harare (2012-2015)

References

External links 

1970 births
Bishops appointed by Pope Francis
Living people
People from Masvingo
Redemptorist bishops
21st-century Roman Catholic bishops in Zimbabwe
Roman Catholic bishops of Chinhoyi